Clowne is a civil parish in the Bolsover District of Derbyshire, England. The parish contains nine listed buildings that are recorded in the National Heritage List for England. Of these, two are listed at Grade II*, the middle of the three grades, and the others are at Grade II, the lowest grade. The parish contains the town of Clowne and the surrounding area. The listed buildings consist of houses and associated structures, the ruins of a former country house, a church, a market cross, and a war memorial. 


Key

Buildings

References

Citations

Sources

 

Lists of listed buildings in Derbyshire